Tom Hooper is an Australian rugby union player who plays for the  in Super Rugby. His playing position is lock. He was named in the Brumbies squad for the 2021 Super Rugby AU season and Super Rugby Trans-Tasman.

Reference list

External links
itsrugby.co.uk Profile

Australian rugby union players
Living people
Rugby union locks
Year of birth missing (living people)
ACT Brumbies players